is a former Japanese football player. He played for Japan national team.

Club career
Kojima was born in Nogata on December 12, 1977. After graduating from high school, he joined Gamba Osaka in 1996. He played many matches as forward from 1997. Around this time, many young players Tsuneyasu Miyamoto, Junichi Inamoto and Ryuji Bando got an opportunity to play in the club. However his opportunity to play decreased behind Kota Yoshihara in 2001. From 2002, he played for Consadole Sapporo (2002), Omiya Ardija (2002), Oita Trinita (2003) and Vissel Kobe (2003-05). At Vissel Kobe, he was converted to mainly defensive midfielder in 2004. He moved to Regional Leagues club FC Gifu in 2006. He retired end of 2008 season.

National team career
On April 26, 2000, Kojima debuted for Japan national team against South Korea.

Club statistics

National team statistics

References

External links

Japan National Football Team Database

1977 births
Living people
Association football people from Fukuoka Prefecture
Japanese footballers
Japan international footballers
J1 League players
J2 League players
Japan Football League players
Gamba Osaka players
Hokkaido Consadole Sapporo players
Omiya Ardija players
Oita Trinita players
Vissel Kobe players
FC Gifu players
Association football midfielders